Niesthrea louisianica is a species of scentless plant bug in the family Rhopalidae. It is found in North America and Oceania.

References

External links

 

Articles created by Qbugbot
Insects described in 1961
Rhopalinae